This is a list of defunct fast-food chains. A restaurant chain is a set of related restaurants with the same name in many different locations that are either under shared corporate ownership (e.g., McDonald's in the U.S.) or franchising agreements. Typically, the restaurants within a chain are built to a standard format through architectural prototype development and offer a standard menu and/or services.

Defunct fast-food restaurant chains

Ameche's Drive-in Five suburban locations in metropolitan Baltimore.
 Burger Chef
 Burger Queen
 Carrols chain in western New York State and Pennsylvania with 150 stores at its peak in the 1960s; featured the Club Burger and sold popular Looney Tunes drinking glasses
 Chicken George
 Chooks Fresh & Tasty
 Clock
 D'Lites
 Dee's Drive-In
 Doggie Diner
 Druther's chain based in Louisville, Kentucky, that became a regional Dairy Queen franchise in 1991; a lone franchised location in Campbellsville, Kentucky, is the only survivor
 Farrell's Ice Cream Parlour
 Forum Cafeterias
 Geri's Hamburgers
 Gino's Hamburgers
 Henry's Hamburgers, with the only remaining location in Benton Harbor, Michigan.
 Horn & Hardart
Howard Johnson's was the largest restaurant chain in the U.S. throughout the 1960s and 1970s, with more than 1,000 combined company-owned and franchised outlets. Today, the chain is defunct—after dwindling down to one location, the last Howard Johnson's restaurant (in Lake George, New York) closed during the 2021 COVID pandemic. 
 Kenny Rogers Roasters still active outside the USA but no American franchisees exist today.
 La Petite Boulangerie 
 Little Tavern
 Lum's
 Mighty Casey's
 Naugles acquired by Del Taco in 1988; all locations were closed or converted by 1995; fans and new investors attempted to revive the brand in 2015
 Noon Mediterranean
 Pioneer Chicken
 Pizza Haven Australian pizza chain
 Pumper Nic chain in Argentina; founded in 1974 and closed in 1999
 Pup 'N' Taco
 Red Barn
 Royal Castle one franchise location survived after chain was liquidated in 1975
 Sambo's
 Sandy's
 ShowBiz Pizza Place Merged into Chuck E. Cheese
The Training Table was a regional chain of fast food restaurants in the U.S. State of Utah. Founded in 1977, the chain focused on gourmet burgers. The chain had five locations in the Salt Lake City metropolitan area.
 Steak and Ale
 Two Pesos
 Wag's
 Wetson's
 White Tower Hamburgers one location remains in Toledo, Ohio
 Wimpy Grills founded in Bloomington, Indiana, in 1934, it eventually grew to 25 locations within the United States and 1,500 outside of the US. The international locations were eventually sold to J. Lyons and Co. in the United Kingdom, which remains open, while all of the American locations eventually closed by 1978.
 Winky's a Pittsburgh institution in the 1960s and 1970s that filed for bankruptcy in 1982
 Yankee Doodle Dandy

See also

 List of defunct restaurants of the United States
 List of defunct retailers of the United States
 List of fast food restaurant chains
 List of restaurant chains
 Lists of restaurants

References

 
Defunct fast-food chains
Restaurant chains
Fast-food restaurant chains